The Roman Catholic Diocese of Xuanhua/Süanhwa is a diocese located in the city of Xuanhua in the Ecclesiastical province of Beijing in China.

History
 May 10, 1926: Established as the Apostolic Vicariate of Xuanhua, from the Apostolic Vicariate of Beijing 北京
 April 11, 1946: Promoted as Diocese of Xuanhua 宣化

Leadership
 Vicars Apostolic of Xuahuafu 宣化府 (Roman Rite)
 Bishop Philip Zhao Huai-yi (May 10, 1926 – October 14, 1927)
 Bishop Peter Cheng You-you (March 28, 1928 – August 25, 1935)
 Bishop Joseph Zhang Run-bo (July 7, 1936 – April 11, 1946)
 Bishops of Xuanhua 宣化 (Roman rite)
 Bishop Joseph Zhang Run-bo (April 11, 1946 – November 20, 1947)
 Bishop Peter Wang Mu-duo (January 8, 1948 – 1959)
 Bishop Xu Li-zhi (1987 - January 19, 1992)
 Bishop Simon Zhang Jiu-mu (1992 - December 12, 1999)
 Bishop Philip Peter Zhao Zhen-dong (December 12, 1999 - July 13, 2007)
 Bishop Thomas Zhao Kexun (July 13, 2007 – present)

References

 GCatholic.org
 Catholic Hierarchy

Roman Catholic dioceses in China
Christian organizations established in 1926
Roman Catholic dioceses and prelatures established in the 20th century
Christianity in Hebei
1926 establishments in China